Gasthof Sternen is located in Wettingen Abbey and is the oldest inn in Switzerland. The building stands north of the monastery church and is under the cantonal protection.

History 
The origins of the inn date back to the monastery founding in 1227. In order to give a special visit for the mothers and sisters of the monks, a guest house was built around 1230, which was at first called "Weiberhaus". It was outside the monastery walls, since the monastery area was not allowed to be entered by women, but it was connected to the inner monastery gate.
In 19th century the building came into the possession of the Aargau canton, but until now the inn is named "Sternen" after the monastery "Maris Stella" ("Stern" in German means "star").

See also 
List of oldest companies

References

External links 
Homepage in German
Hotel on Google Maps

Hotels in Switzerland
Restaurants in Switzerland
Cultural property of national significance in Aargau
Tourist attractions in Aargau
1227 establishments in Europe
13th-century establishments in Switzerland